Going Up is a musical comedy in three acts with music by Louis Hirsch and book and lyrics by Otto Harbach and James Montgomery.  Set in the US city of Lenox, Massachusetts, at the end of World War I, the musical tells the story of a writer turned aviator who wins the hand of the high society girl that he loves by his daring handling of the joystick of a biplane.  Popular songs included "Hip Hooray", "If You Look in Her Eyes", "Kiss Me", "Going Up", "Do It for Me", "The Tickle Toe", and "Down! Up! Left! Right!".

The musical was a hit on Broadway in 1917 and again the following year in London.  Revivals and a film adaptation followed.

Background and productions
The development of aviation and flying in the early years of the 20th century captivated the public's attention.  Going Up is based on a 1910 play, The Aviator, by James Montgomery.  The play took on new significance during World War I.

The musical was produced by George M. Cohan and Sam H. Harris and, after tryouts from November 15, 1917, in Atlantic City, New Jersey, it opened on  Broadway at the Liberty Theatre in New York on December 25, 1917.  It ran for 351 performances, directed by Edward Royce and James Montgomery, starring Edith Day and featuring the young Ed Begley.  A full-size biplane was used in the production, delighting audiences.  The production ran through October 1918, and three companies were sent out to tour it.  In the meantime, the musical was introduced to British audiences in Manchester, England, from May 13, 1918 before transferring to the Gaiety Theatre to London, opening on May 22, 1918, and running for an even more successful 574 performances.  The London cast starred Joseph Coyne and Marjorie Gordon and featured Evelyn Laye.  Reviews were uniformly positive.  In Australia, Cyril Ritchard and Madge Elliott starred in the piece in 1919.  The piece enjoyed various tours and revivals thereafter.

A 1976 Broadway revival tried out at the Goodspeed Opera House, East Haddam, Connecticut, directed by Bill Gile.  The production moved to Broadway, at the John Golden Theatre, on September 19, 1976, closing on October 31, 1976, after 49 performances. The director was Gile and the choreographer was Dan Siretta (who was nominated for a Drama Desk Award for his work), with sets by Edward Haynes, costumes by David Toser and lighting by Peter M. Ehrhardt.  The production starred Brad Blaisdell as Robert and featured Pat Lysinger (Miss Zonne), Stephen Bray (John), Kimberly Farr (Grace), Michael Tartel (Jules), Walter Bobbie (Hopkinson), Maureen Brennan (Madeleine), Noel Craig (James) and Ronn Robinson (Sam).  The show was condensed into two acts and included three interpolated Hirsch songs: "Hello Frisco", from the Ziegfeld Follies of 1915, with lyrics by Gene Buck, sung by Miss Zonne and the Four Aviators; "I'll Think of You", from The Rainbow Girl, with lyrics by Rennold Wolf, sung by Grace and Robert; and "My Sumurun Girl", from The Whirl of Society, with lyrics by Al Jolson, sung by Miss Zonne and Sam.

A 1923 motion picture farce was based on the musical, with a screenplay by Raymond Griffith.  It starred Douglas MacLean, Hallam Cooley, Francis McDonald, Hughie Mack and Marjorie Daw.

Synopsis
At the Gordon Inn in Lenox, Massachusetts, bestselling author Robert Street is very popular and has an ego to match, pretending that writing a book about flying makes one a pilot; he has never been in a plane.  His agent thinks it would be a great idea for him to go up in an airplane as a publicity stunt.  His girlfriend Grace, whose parents would rather see her marry French flying ace Jules Gaillard, also thinks this is a good idea, as it would impress her father.  Jules thinks so too: he challenges Robert to an air race!  A mechanician, Sam Robinson, is sent for; but when he arrives, he is too stout to go up in the airplane, so Robert goes alone.  The flight is successful: Robert wins the race and lands in one piece.  He happily marries Grace.

Roles and original Broadway and London casts
Miss Zonne, a telephone girl - Ruth Donnelly; Ruby Miller
John Gordon, manager of the Gordon Inn - John Park; Clifton Alderson
F. H. Douglas, a chronic bettor - Donald Meek; Arthur Chesney
Mrs. Douglas, his wife - Grace Peters; Elaine Inescort
Jules Gaillard, their prospective French son-in-law - Joseph Lertora; Henry de Bray
Grace Douglas, his fiancee - Edith Day; Marjorie Gordon
Madeline Manners, her chum - Marion Sunshine; Evelyn Laye
Hopkinson Brown, her fiance - Frank Otto; Austin Melford
Robert Street, author of "Going Up", in love with Grace - Frank Craven (replaced by Bobby Watson); Joseph Coyne
James Brooks, his publisher - Arthur Stuart Hull; Franklyn Bellamy
Sam Robinson, a mechanician - Ed Begley; Roy Byford
Louis, Gaillard's mechanician - Francois Vaulry; Louis Mathyl

Musical numbers

Overture    
Act I 
No. 1. Paging Mr. Street – Ensemble and Miss Zonne
No. 2. I'll Bet You – John Gordon and Ensemble 
No. 3. I Want a Determined Boy – Madeline Manners and Hopkinson Brown
No. 4. If You Look in Her Eyes – Grace Douglas and Madeline
No. 5. Going Up – Jules Gaillard and Ensemble 
No. 6. First Act, Second Act, Third Act (Finale Act I) – Robert and Grace

Act II 
Entr'acte (reprise of item 4)
No. 7. The Touch of a Woman's Hand – Grace and Girls
No. 8. Down, Up, Left, Right – Robert Street, Hopkinson, James Brooks and Sam Robinson
No. 9. Do It for Me – Madeline and Hopkinson
No. 10. (Everybody Ought To Know How to Do) The Tickle Toe – Grace and Ensemble
No. 11. Kiss Me – Grace and Jules
No. 12. She'll tell you what you're to do, dear – Grace and Robert
No. 13. Finale Act II

Act III  
Entr'acte 
No. 14. Hip hooray, see the crowds appearing – Chorus
No. 14a. There's a Brand New Hero – Jules, Madeline and Ensemble
No. 15. Here's to the Two of You – Grace and Ensemble
No. 16. You start to sway – Ensemble
No. 17. Finale Ultimo – "You start to sway" (reprise)

Recordings
HMV Records published six discs of songs from the show, featuring the London cast. The numbers were: "First Act, Second Act, Third Act" (Act I finale) with Coyne and Gordon; "Down, Up, Left, Right" with Coyne, Melford, Byford and Bellamy; "If You Look in Her Eyes" with Gordon and Laye; "Kiss Me!" with Gordon and de Bray; "The Tickle Toe", with Gordon, Bellamy and chorus; and "The Touch of a Woman's Hand", with Gordon and chorus. Several of the songs were re-issued on CD in the collection "Broadway Through the Gramophone (1844-1930): New York in European Footsteps" (4 volumes) on the Pearl label in 2002.

Notes

References
Information about Going Up and Hirsch

External links

Internet Broadway Database, Going Up, 1917
Song list and links to Midi files
List of longest running plays in London and New York

Broadway musicals
1917 musicals
Musicals based on plays
Musicals about World War I
Massachusetts in fiction
Aviation musicals
Musicals by George M. Cohan
Musicals by Otto Harbach